Le Mag is a French television show broadcast direct on the French music and entertainment specialty channel NRJ 12 from Monday to Friday from 7 to 8 pm.

Hosted by Matthieu Delormeau, various co-hosts took part with him, the first being Jeny Priez for 3 seasons. Priez was suspended after her alleged involvement in inside betting on the outcome of the Montpellier Agglomération Handball and Cesson Rennes Métropole Handball match) and was replaced by Ayem Nour of season 5 of the reality series Secret Story. She co-hosted for seasons 3 and 4 of Le Mag. Finally Caroline Receveur of season 2 of Secret Story and of Hollywood Girls co-hosted seasons 4 and 5 of Le Mag. The show also broadcasts various subjects by chronicler contributors.

The show premiered on 10 January 2011 on NRJ 12 and has become famous for inviting television reality personalities. The show was used as a launch for the French reality television show Les Anges de la téléréalité. Following, it became a launchpad to promote similar reality television shows on NRJ 12 like L'île des vérités, Hollywood Girl: Une nouvelle vie en Californie etc.

Team 

Code :
 Current presenters Co-presenters Chroniqueurs actuels Anciens chroniqueurs

Chroniclers
(season(s) in parenthesis)

Julien Mielcarek (Season 1)
Valérie Khal (1)
Thierry Calmont (1)
Cyprien Iov (1, 2)
Benoît Dubois (2, 3, 4, 5)
Nicolas Touderte (2, 3, 4, 5) 
Dominique Damien Rehel (2, 3, 4, 5) 
Ayem Nour (2)
Loana Petrucciani (2)
Thomas Vitiello (2, 3)
Anne Denis (2, 3)
Caroline Receveur (2, 3)
Marie Garet (3)
			
Julia Flabat (3)		
Marine Boudou (3)		
Nabilla Benattia (3)			
Lucie Azard (3)		
Lucie Bernardoni (3)
Davia Martelli (3, 4)
Capucine Anav (3, 4, 5)
Kévin Vatant (3, 4, 5)
Cynthia Brown (3, 4, 5)
Aurélie Dotremont (4)			
Tara Damiano (4)	
Gautier Preaux	(4)		
Kelly Helard (4)
		
Nicos (4)	
Hassan	(4)		
Stéphane Larue (4)			
Annabelle Baudin (4)
Antoni Ruiz (4, 5)
Florian Paris (4, 5)
Linda Roubine (5)		
Shanna Kress (5)	
Thibault Kuro-Garcia (5)		
Christie Nicora (5)
Romain Migdalski (5)		
Louise Buffet (5)
Aurélie Van Daelen (5)

French music television series
2011 French television series debuts
NRJ 12 original programming